Bank of Africa Uganda Limited, also known as BOA Uganda (BOAU), is one of the commercial banks in Uganda that have been licensed by the Bank of Uganda, the country's central bank and national banking regulator.

Location
The headquarters and main branch of Bank of Africa Uganda Limited, are located at 45 Jinja Road, in the central business district of Kampala, Uganda's capital and largest city. The geographical coordinates of the bank's headquarters are: 0°18'56.0"N, 32°35'32.0"E (Latitude:0.315556; Longitude:32.592222).

Overview
BOA Uganda is involved in all aspects of commercial banking although its focus is on providing banking services to multinational companies, mid-size local enterprises, and small retail businesses. As of December 2019, BOA Uganda was a medium-sized financial services provider, with total assets of  UGX:803.07 billion (approximately US$218.25 million), with shareholders' equity of UGX:123.54 billion (approximately US$33.58 million).

Bank of Africa Group
The bank is a member of the Bank of Africa Group, a multinational, Pan African bank headquartered in Bamako, Mali, with presence in thirty-one countries. The group also maintains an office in Paris, France. As of June 2015, the group employed more than 12,500 people in more than 1,200 branches, servicing more than 4.5 million customers, with a total asset base in excess of €23.8 billion.

History
BOA Uganda started its operations in 1984 as Sembule Investment Bank (SIB). In 1996, SIB was purchased by Banque Belgolaise and the Netherlands Development Finance Company. The new owners renamed the bank Allied Bank. In October 2006, Banque Belgolaise sold its shares to investors that included the Bank of Africa (Kenya), Aureos East Africa Fund LLC, and Central Holdings (Uganda) Limited. The name of the bank was changed to Bank of Africa (Uganda) Limited.

Ownership
The share ownership of BOA Uganda as of 31 December 2018 was as illustrated in the table below:

Source:
 Bank of Africa Uganda: Annual Report 2018

Governance
The bank is supervised by an eight-person board of directors, chaired by John Caruthers, a non-executive board member.

Management team
John Caruthers is the chairman of the bank. In December 2010, Edigold Monday was appointed managing director of the bank. She became the first indigenous woman to rise to this level at a Ugandan commercial bank. In April 2014, Monday resigned. Arthur Isiko was appointed to replace her.

Branch network
As of December 2016, the bank maintained branches in all regions of the country, including at the following locations:

 Main Branch: 45 Jinja Road, Kampala
 Equatorial Branch: 84/86 Ben Kiwanuka Street, Kampala 
 Ndeeba Branch: 1024 Masaka Road, Ndeeba
 Taxi Park Branch: Mukwano Centre, 40-46 Ben Kiwanuka Street, Kampala
 Kampala Road Branch: 48 Kampala Road, Kampala
 Ntinda Branch: 49 Ntinda Road, Ntinda, Kampala
 Wandegeya Branch: KM Plaza, 85 Bombo Road, Wandegeya, Kampala
 Entebbe Branch: 16 Kampala Road, Entebbe
 Nakivubo Branch: 15 Nakivubo Road, Kampala
 Mukono Branch: 13 Kampala Road, Mukono
 Kabalagala Branch: 559 Ggaba Road, Kabalagala, Kampala
 Oasis Branch: Oasis Mall, 88-94 Yusuf Lule Road, Kampala
 Jinja Main Branch: 1 Main Street, Jinja
 Clive Road Branch: 18 Clive Road East, Jinja
 Arua Branch: 19 Avenue Road, Arua
 Lira Branch: 1A Balla Road, Lira
 Mbarara Branch: 1 Mbaguta Road, Mbarara
 Mbale Branch: 26 Cathedral Avenue, Mbale
 Fort Portal Branch: 14 Bwamba Road, Fort Portal
 Gulu Branch: 11 Awere Road, Gulu
 Kololo Branch: 9 Cooper Road, Kisementi, Kololo, Kampala
 Kawempe Branch: 125 Bombo Road, Kawempe, Kampala
 Nansana Branch: 5390 Nansana Town Centre, Nansana
 Luzira Branch: 1329/1330 Port Bell Road, Luzira, Kampala
 Hoima Branch: 13 Wright Road, Hoima
 Nateete Branch: 1-2 Old Masaka Road, Nateete, Kampala
 Patongo Branch - 33 Dollo Road, Patongo
 Bbira Mini Branch: 2731 Mityana Road, Bbira, Wakiso District
 Namasuba Branch: Freedom City Mall, 4010 Entebbe Road, Namasuba, Kampala
 Kalongo Mini Branch: 16 Patongo Road Kalongo
 Business Centre - 9 Kittante Road, Kampala
 Rwenzori Mini Branch: Rwenzori House, 1 Lumumba Avenue, Nakasero, Kampala
 Masaka Branch: 7 Birch Avenue, Masaka
 Rubirizi Branch: Mbarara-Kasese Highway, Rubirizi.

In addition to the brick-and-mortar branches, the bank has a mobile banking vehicle covering nine districts and key trading
centres in the districts of Lira, Pader, Oyam, Lira, Kole, Apac, Dokolo, Kaberamaido, Alebtong, and Otuke.

See also

List of banks in Uganda
Banking in Uganda
Bank of Africa Kenya Limited
Bank of Africa Rwanda Limited
Bank of Africa Ghana Limited

References

External links
 
 Overview of Bank of Africa (Uganda)

Banks of Uganda
Bank of Africa Group
Banks established in 1984
1984 establishments in Uganda
Companies based in Kampala